Kimhyŏnggwŏn County is a kun, or county, in southeastern Ryanggang province, North Korea.  It borders South Hamgyŏng to the south. Previously known as Pungsan, it was renamed by Kim Il Sung in 1990.  He named it after his uncle, Kim Hyŏng-gwŏn.  It is known for its striking scenery and for the Pungsan Dog, a large breed of hunting dog.

Geography
Kimhyŏnggwŏn lies on the southeastern edge of the Kaema Plateau, and is covered with mountainous terrain. The Hamgyong Mountains and the Puksubaek Mountains both pass through the county. The highest peak is Paeksan.  There are many streams; the chief among them is the Hŏch'ŏn River.  Some 88% of the county's area is occupied by forestland.

Climate

Administrative divisions
Kimhyŏnggwŏn county is divided into 1 ŭp (town), 1 rodonjagu (workers' district) and 17 ri (villages):

Economy
There are several hydroelectric power stations in the county. There is also a great deal of dry-field farming; the chief local crops include hops and flax.  In addition, potatoes, wheat, soybeans, and barley are grown, and livestock are also raised. In addition, there is some manufacturing and mining, with deposits of gold, nickel, graphite and iron sulfide found in the county.

Transportation
Kimhyŏnggwŏn is served by road, but not by rail.

See also
Geography of North Korea
Administrative divisions of North Korea

References

External links

Counties of Ryanggang